"I Can't Be Myself"  is a song written and performed by American country music artist Merle Haggard and The Strangers.  It was released in October 1970 as the second single from the album Hag.  The song peaked at number three on the U.S. Billboard Hot Country Singles chart and peaked at number six on the Bubbling Under Hot 100. It reached two on the Canadian RPM Country Tracks.

Chart performance

References

1970 singles
1970 songs
Merle Haggard songs
Songs written by Merle Haggard
Song recordings produced by Ken Nelson (American record producer)
Capitol Records singles